Steve Harvey's Funderdome, a portmanteau of funding and Thunderdome, is an American business reality competition show that premiered June 11, 2017 on ABC and produced by MGM Television. In a format similar to Shark Tank, the show features two contestants who pitch products to a studio audience which votes on who will get seed funding for their project.

Format 
Each show features three competitions between two inventors (or teams of inventors) competing for the same amount of seed funding—$10,000, $20,000, $50,000, or $100,000. One inventor gives a pitch, followed by a short question-and-answer period with Harvey; the process then repeats for the other inventor. After this, the audience votes on which product they would like to see funded.

Before the winner is revealed, both competitors are offered the opportunity to "cash out." Both inventors (or one chosen member from a team) stand next to a button. A series of amounts—which may increase or decrease—are shown on a screen, along with a timer; to cash out at a particular value, a contestant must hit the button before the timer runs out. Most cash out offers are between 5 and 25 percent of the desired amount (e.g., $5,000–$25,000 for inventors seeking $100,000). In some cases, Harvey has revealed the percentages of the vote before giving the inventors the chance to cash out.

There are three possible outcomes for each competition:
 Neither inventor cashes out: The vote winner gets the full amount, while the loser gets nothing.
 Vote loser cashes out: The vote winner gets the full amount, while the loser gets the cash-out amount instead of nothing.
 Vote winner cashes out: The vote winner gets the cash-out amount, while the loser gets nothing.

International versions 
Shortly before the show's debut, MGM Worldwide Television Distribution announced that TF1 acquired the rights to the French version of the show.

Piracy 
On June 5, 2017, a message from a believed-to-be cybercriminal stated that eight episodes of this series were already online. A similar group had earlier leaked episodes of Orange Is the New Black. However, ABC had no public comment about the piracy of the show, which was not expected to affect the show's viewership because the target audience was considered unlikely to use piracy websites.

Episodes

References

External links 
  (archived)
 

2017 American television series debuts
2017 American television series endings
American Broadcasting Company original programming
2010s American reality television series
Business-related television series
Television series by MGM Television